Walter Junior Cabral Bueriberi (born 25 September 1995), known as Walter Junior, is a Spanish-born Equatoguinean professional basketball player who plays as a power forward for CD Estela and the Equatorial Guinea national team.

Early life
Walter Junior was born in Madrid to a Bissau-Guinean father and an Equatorial Guinean Bubi mother.

Club career
Walter Junior has developed his entire club career in Spain.

International career
Walter Junior has joined the Equatorial Guinea men's national basketball team in January 2020.

References

External links

1995 births
Living people
Citizens of Equatorial Guinea through descent
Equatoguinean men's basketball players
Power forwards (basketball)
People of Bubi descent
Equatoguinean people of Bissau-Guinean descent
Sportspeople of Bissau-Guinean descent
Spanish men's basketball players
Basketball players from Madrid
Spanish sportspeople of Equatoguinean descent
Spanish people of Bubi descent
Spanish people of Bissau-Guinean descent
Spanish sportspeople of African descent
Baloncesto Fuenlabrada players